Fourth World refers to a sub-population subjected to social exclusion in global society, or stateless and notably impoverished or marginalized nations.

Fourth World may also refer to:

 Fourth World (band), Brazilian musical group
 Fourth World (album), by the Brazilian group Fourth World, 1993
 Fourth World, Vol. 1: Possible Musics, album by Jon Hassell and Brian Eno, 1980
 Fourth World (comics), created by Jack Kirby at DC Comics in the early 1970s
 Fourth World trilogy of novels by Kate Thompson
 The Fourth World (album), debut album by Maroon 5
 The Fourth World (novel) by Dennis Danvers

See also
 The fourth part of the world (disambiguation)
 First World
 Second World
 Third World
 Fifth World (disambiguation)
 Sixth World
 Unrepresented Nations and Peoples Organisation
 Developing countries